The Peruvian Clásico (El Clásico Peruano) or the Classic of the Classics of Peruvian Football (El Clásico de los Clásicos del Futbol Peruano) is the name given to Peru's biggest football derby between Alianza Lima and Universitario. The rivalry between these two clubs started in their first game on 23 September 1928 when the two first faced off in a violent game. Both clubs come from the capital city, Lima.

The rivalry has given rise to an intense conflict between the working class and upper class of Lima, as the city went through a series of changes in the late-1920s, including public works and better education. Alianza Lima—coming from a more working-class neighborhood—has had many black players of immense talent, and Universitario, having been founded by a group of university students, generated many white players. Therefore, at some times, the duel amongst both teams is labeled as negros contra blancos.

Out of the 367 matches played, Alianza has come out victorious 142 times, more than Universitario's 123.

History
The first Clásico took place on 23 September 1928 between Federación Universitaria and Alianza Lima. Alianza Lima was the favorite of the game because they had already been champions of the League and also Federación Universitaria was a fairly new club, founded only four years ago and it being their first year in the first division. However, Federacion Universitaria won the game with an early penalty goal during the first-half at the seventh minute by Pablo Pacheco. By the eighty-first minute, Alianza Lima had lost 5 players to red cards and the game was suspended by the Uruguayan referee Julio Borelli. The violence was also seen in the stands between the fans of Federacion Universitaria and Alianza's players. Fans threw canes at the players and because of this, years later this match was nicknamed El Clásico de los Bastonazos.

Finals, semi-finals and title deciders
Alianza Lima and Universitario have met in several league finals and title-deciding matches. Despite Alianza Lima having an advantage over Universitario in games won, Universitario has claimed the most title-deciding matches. These include:
Alianza Lima 2–0 Federación Universitaria (1 November 1928) – This was only the third time the two teams had faced off. Both teams tied for first place in the final group stage in which Federación Universitaria–later to become Universitario de Deportes–had won the violent clásico played in the group stage. Their tie for first place led forced an extra match to determine the champion. The game was a 1–1 draw which led to a replay of the match. Alianza Lima won the replay 2–0 to become 1928 champion.
Alianza Lima 4–1 Universitario (15 May 1947) – The Torneo Apertura was a preseason tournament played by the top four teams of the previous season. Alianza Lima and Universitario were tied for first which forced an extra match to determine the 1947 Torneo Apertura winner. The clásico already played was a 1–0 win for Universitario. However, Alianza Lima won this decisive match by 4 goals to 1 which was also Alianza Lima's first win against Universitario in a Torneo Apertura.
Alianza Lima 2–1 Universitario (27 May 1956) – Alianza Lima and Universitario had tied for first place in the league standings which led to a playoff match. By this time, football in Peru had achieved professional status. The match, played in 1956, was being played for the 1955 season title. Alianza Lima won with goals from Valeriano López and Máximo Mosquera over Segundo Guevara's goal for Universitario for their eleventh First Division title.
Alianza Lima 0–0 (7–8 p) Universitario (8 August 1985) – The first semi-final match between Alianza Lima and Universitario was played at Alianza Lima's Estadio Alejandro Villanueva for the Torneo Regional of the 1985 season. The match was a scoreless draw which led to the first and only penalty shootout ever contested between the two. In the shootout, both teams' keepers, one being the Argentine Ramón Quiroga, were drawn into a verbal fight. The match's atmosphere was intensified by the keepers' feud on the field during the shootout. Universitario would go on to win the shootout and advance to the Regional final.
Universitario 1–0 Alianza Lima (26 March 1988) – The first season final between the derby rivals played for the 1987 season played at the Estadio Nacional. Universitario had won the Torneo Regional while Alianza Lima advanced to the final through the all-play-all Descentralizado Liguilla. Both teams reached the final with 17 First Division titles under their belt. During the course of the season, Alianza Lima had won 2 derbies while Universitario had only won one in addition to two draws. In the final, Fidel Suárez scored the only goal of the game to give Universitario their eighteenth First Division title.
Copa Plácido Galindo – Universitario and Alianza Lima played in a two-legged semi-final for this one-off football tournament in 1989.
Alianza Lima 0–2 Universitario (16 September 1989) – In the first leg of the semi-final, Universitario earned an away victory at Alianza Lima's Estadio Alejandro Villanueva with goals from Fidel Suárez and Jesus Torrealba.
Universitario 0–1 Alianza Lima (19 September 1989) – In the second leg of the semi-final, Alianza Lima won by a single goal scored by Juan Saavedra at the Estadio Nacional. However, on aggregate Universitario had a one-goal lead which advanced them to the final.
Universitario 1–0 Alianza Lima (30 January 1991) – For the fifth time in history, Universitario and Alianza Lima had finished a tournament round sharing first place in the Liguilla phase of the 1990 Torneo Regional II. An extra match was arranged at the Estadio Nacional. Roberto Martínez scored Universitario's lone goal for a trip to the season final against Torneo Regional I winner Sport Boys.
Universitario 1–0 Alianza Lima (27 December 1995) – For the 1995 season, Universitario and Alianza Lima tied yet again in the standings but this time for second place in the Liguilla phase. An extra match was played to determine the season runner-up which would qualify to the Copa Libertadores with Descentralizado champion Sporting Cristal. Prior to this match, of the four derbies played, 3 were victories for Alianza Lima while the remaining game was a scoreless draw. In spite of the record favoring Alianza Lima, Universitario won with a late Roberto Martínez goal in the second half sending to the 1996 Copa Libertadores.
1999 Torneo Descentralizado Finals – Universitario and Alianza Lima had won the Torneo Apertura and Torneo Clausura respectively both advancing to the finals of the 1999 season.
Universitario 3–0 Alianza Lima (15 December 1999) – The first leg of the final was played in the Estadio Nacional. In the first half, Roberto Farfán stole a misguided header by an Alianza Lima defender and lobbed it over Cristian del Mar for Universitario's first goal. In the second half, Eduardo Esidio received a bad free kick taken by Alianza Lima close to their own penalty box in which Esidio only had to kick to score the second goal of the match. Near the end of the second half, Universitario had a free kick just outside Alianza's penalty box which José del Solar took in order to score Universitario's third goal and seal the victory.
Alianza Lima 1–0 Universitario (20 December 1999) – The second leg was played at the Estadio Alejandro Villanueva. Alianza Lima needed to score at least 3 goals to tie on aggregate. Víctor Mafla scored a late first half goal for Alianza however they failed to reach Universitario on aggregate earning them their 23rd title.
2002 Torneo Apertura – Universitario and Alianza Lima tied for first in the Torneo Apertura leading to a tie-breaking match for title.
Universitario 1–0 Alianza Lima (26 June 2002) – The first clásico played at Universitario's Estadio Monumental "U". A Martín Villalonga header in the early second half gave Universitario's only goal of the match. Violence surrounded the match by fans which led to the suspension of Alianza Lima's stadium for the second leg.
Alianza Lima 0–0 Universitario (7 July 2002) – The second leg was moved to Trujillo and played at the Estadio Mansiche. The scoreless draw gave Universitario the title and sent them to the 2003 Copa Libertadores. The Torneo Apertura also guaranteed Universitario a spot in the 2002 final if they managed to place above 5th place in the Torneo Clausura.
2009 Torneo Descentralizado Finals – The latest final Universitario and Alianza Lima have played. In the final, goal difference was not used as a tie-breaking criterion. If the finalists were tied on points after the second leg, a third match at a neutral venue would've been necessary to determine the champion. Universitario reached the final with a winning streak having won both derbies played in the course of the season and the last derby of the 2008 season.
Alianza Lima 0–1 Universitario (8 December 2009) – The first leg was played at the Estadio Alejandro Villanueva. A first half goal by Piero Alva put Universitario in the lead. For much of the second half, Alianza Lima consistently attacked but thanks to a great match by goalkeeper Raúl Fernández, Universitario managed to finish the game with a clean sheet.
Universitario 1–0 Alianza Lima (13 December 2009) – The second leg was contested at Universitario's Estadio Monumental "U" which had hosted few clásicos since 2002 due to security issues. Nolberto Solano scored a 10th-minute penalty which led to Universitario's victory ending an eight-season title drought and their 25th First Division title as well as a 5-game winning streak against Alianza Lima.

Statistics

Trophies

Games
As of 20 February 2023

Records
Record victory – Alianza Lima 9–1 Universitario (12 June 1949)
Record Primera División victory – Alianza Lima 6–1 Universitario (30 December 1977)
Record Copa Libertadores victory – Universitario 6–3 Alianza Lima (24 February 1979)
Most goals scored – 29, Teodoro Fernández
Most appearances overall – 61, José Luis Carranza
First player to score in a Primera Division match - Mario Catalá
Most goals scored in a match – 6, Eduardo Fernández Meyzán (14 April 1946)

Results

Primera División

Campeonato de Selección y Competencia (1928–1950)

Campeonato Profesional de Lima (1951–1965)

Torneo Descentralizado (1966–2018)

Liga 1 (2019–present)

International

Torneo Apertura

Filler tournament
During the 1969 season, Universitario and Alianza Lima faced off in a filler tournament. The tournament did not award points towards the Descentralizado of the season.

Friendlies

Footnotes

A.  Includes titles as "Federación Universitaria" (until 1932).
B.  Includes titles as "Sport Alianza" (Liga).
C.  Between 1928 and 1965, there was no designated home team.
D.  A year indicates game was played in the early months of the following year due to lack of time.
E.  Universitario won 8–7 in a penalty shootout to determine the winning semifinalist.
F.  The original score was a 1–1 draw but Alianza Lima fielded two suspended players. The match was awarded 1–0 to Universitario.
G.  The original score was a 1–1 draw but Universitario fielded one suspended players. The match was awarded 3–0 to Alianza Lima.

References

Peruvian football rivalries
Club Universitario de Deportes
Alianza Lima